City of St. Charles School District is a School district in St. Charles, Missouri. The Administration Building of the School District is located at 600 N 6th St, St Charles, MO 63301.

Schools

High schools
St. Charles High School
St. Charles West High School

Middle schools
Hardin Middle School
Jefferson Intermediate Middle School

Elementary schools
Harris Elementary School 
Monroe Elementary School
George M. Null Elementary School
Coverdell Elementary School
Blackhurst Elementary School
Lincoln Elementary School

Other
Lewis and Clark Career Center https://www.stcharlessd.org/lewisandclarkcareercenter
Success Campus, an alternative school for students with a lack of credits

References

External links

School districts in Missouri
Education in St. Charles County, Missouri
School districts established in 1846
1846 establishments in Missouri